James Ackerman may refer to:

 James S. Ackerman (1919–2016), American architectural historian
 James Waldo Ackerman (1926–1984), United States federal judge

See also
Ackerman (surname)